The 3rd South Carolina Volunteer Infantry Reigiment (Colored) was an African-American infantry regiment that served in the Union Army during the American Civil War.

Service
The 3rd South Carolina Infantry was organized at Hilton Head, South Carolina and mustered into Federal service in June 1863.  The unit was on post duty at Hilton Head until it was moved to Jacksonville, Florida in February 1864.

There was a mutiny over pay.  Senator Henry Wilson of Massachusetts mentioned the incident during a debate in Congress over the pay of African-American Union soldiers:

Colonel Augustus Bennett was the commanding officer.  Sergeant William Walker and Samson Read were involved in the mutiny, and Walker was the man executed.

The regiment was consolidated with 4th South Carolina to form the 21st United States Colored Infantry Regiment on March 14, 1864.

See also

List of Union South Carolina Civil War Units
South Carolina in the American Civil War

Notes

References
 The Civil War Archive

Infantry, 003
South Carolina Infantry, 003
Military units and formations established in 1863
1863 establishments in South Carolina
Military units and formations disestablished in 1864